Daniel Smith (born 20 March 1993) is a professional rugby league footballer who plays as a  and  for the Castleford Tigers (Heritage № 990) in the Betfred Super League.

He previously played for the Leeds Rhinos, Wakefield Trinity Wildcats and the Huddersfield Giants in the Super League, and the South Sydney Rabbitohs in the NRL. He has spent time at Oldham (Heritage № 1300) and Featherstone Rovers on dual registration from Leeds and Wakefield respectively, and on loan from Huddersfield to both clubs again.

Background
Smith was born in Pontefract, West Yorkshire, England. He is the brother of fellow rugby league footballer Cameron Smith.

Smith played at junior level for amateur side Castleford Lock Lane. In 2009, at the age of 15, he joined the academy at the Leeds Rhinos.

Career

Leeds Rhinos 
Smith was promoted to the senior Leeds squad prior to the 2012 season, and was allocated squad number 30. However, he did not make any first-team appearances for the Rhinos.

Oldham (dual registration) 
In June 2012, Smith joined Championship 1 side Oldham on dual registration. He made four appearances for the Roughyeds.

South Sydney Rabbitohs 
Smith moved to Australia in 2013 to play for South Sydney Rabbitohs under-20 side, where he made 24 appearances. At the end of his time down under, he recalled "Australia was the best experience of my life. It’s changed me massively on and off the field."

Wakefield Trinity Wildcats 
Smith returned to England at the end of the year, signing a two-year contract with the Wakefield Trinity Wildcats in October 2013.

In July 2014, Smith signed a new three-year deal with Wakefield.

In 2015, he made a further 19 appearances and scored 4 tries, before leaving for Huddersfield in July as part of a deal that saw Anthony Mullally move the other way.

Featherstone Rovers (dual registration) 
In 2014, Smith played one game for Featherstone Rovers on dual registration, scoring a try in his only appearance.

Huddersfield Giants 
In July 2015, Smith was signed by Huddersfield Giants on a four-and-a-half year deal. 

He scored his first try for the Giants against his previous club Wakefield just weeks after completing his move away.

On 27 March 2019, Huddersfield announced that, as of 1 April, Smith would be released from the final year of his contract due to "him not featuring in [head coach] Simon [Woolford]'s plans". Across his time with Huddersfield, Smith made 50 appearances and scored 5 tries.

Oldham (loan) 
Smith re-joined Oldham, this time playing in the Championship, on loan from Huddersfield in 2017. Across July, he made 3 appearances and scored 1 try.

Featherstone Rovers (loan) 
Smith re-joined Featherstone Rovers on a one-month loan deal in January 2019. In his second stint at the club, he made 5 appearances and scored 2 tries.

Castleford Tigers 
On 2 April 2019, Castleford Tigers announced the signing of Smith on a deal until the end of the 2020 season. He was assigned squad number 34. Castleford Director of Rugby Jon Wells said "Daniel has been a target of ours for some time now and we are fortunate that the opportunity has arisen to bring him to the club earlier than we anticipated." Smith himself said of the signing: "I'm from here and I've always wanted to play for this club. I hope this is my last move."

Smith returned to the John Smith's Stadium on his first Tigers appearance, making his Castleford début against his previous club Huddersfield on 11 April 2019. He went on to appear 19 times for Castleford in 2019, scoring 1 try. Castleford Director of Rugby Jon Wells described him as a "hard-running, ball-playing, offloading" forward.

In 2020, Smith played in every game for Castleford until the season was suspended due to the Covid-19 pandemic. A pectoral injury disrupted his return upon Super League's resumption in August and limited him to 10 appearances that year. In December 2020, Smith agreed a contract extension for the 2021 season.

In May 2021, Smith signed a new deal with Castleford to stay with the club for a further two years. On 17 July 2021, he played for Castleford in their 2021 Challenge Cup Final loss against St. Helens. Throughout the 2021 season, Smith made 18 appearances and scored 3 tries. He was predominantly utilised as a prop but also covered loose forward and halfback.

References

External links

Castleford Tigers profile
Huddersfield Giants profile
SL profile

1993 births
Living people
Castleford Tigers players
English rugby league players
Featherstone Rovers players
Huddersfield Giants players
Leeds Rhinos players
Oldham R.L.F.C. players
Rugby league locks
Rugby league players from Pontefract
Rugby league props
Wakefield Trinity players